The All-Ireland Senior Hurling Championship of 1986 was the 100th staging of Ireland's premier hurling knock-out competition. Cork won the championship, beating Galway 4–13 to 2–15 in the final at Croke Park, Dublin.

The championship

Fortmat

Munster Championship

Quarter-final: (1 match) This is a single match between the first two teams drawn from the province of Munster.  One team is eliminated at this stage while the winners advance to the semi-finals.

Semi-finals: (2 matches) The winner of the lone quarter-final joins the other three Munster teams to make up the semi-final pairings.  Two teams are eliminated at this stage while the winners advance to the final.

Final: (1 match) The winner of the two semi-finals contest this game.  One team is eliminated at this stage while the winners advance to the All-Ireland semi-final.

Leinster Championship

Quarter-finals: (2 matches) These are two matches between the first four teams drawn from the province of Leinster.  Two teams are eliminated at this stage while the winners advance to the semi-finals.

Semi-finals: (2 matches) The winners of the two quarter-finals join the other two Leinster teams to make up the semi-final pairings.  Two teams are eliminated at this stage while the winners advance to the final.

Final: (1 match) The winners of the two semi-finals contest this game.  One team is eliminated at this stage while the winners advance to the All-Ireland semi-final.

All-Ireland Championship

Quarter-final: (1 match) This is a single match between Galway and the winners of the All-Ireland 'B' championship.  One team is eliminated at this stage while the winners advance to the semi-final where they play the Leinster champions.

Semi-finals: (2 matches) The winners of the lone quarter-final join the Munster and Leinster champions and Antrim to make up the semi-final pairings.  The provincial champions are kept apart in separate semi-finals.  Two teams are eliminated at this stage while the winners advance to the final.

Final: (1 match) The two winners of the semi-finals contest this game.

Fixtures

Leinster Senior Hurling championship

Munster Senior Hurling championship

All-Ireland Senior Hurling Championship

Championship statistics

Scoring

Hat-trick heroes:
First hat-trick of the championship: P. J. Cuddy for Laois against Offaly (Leinster semi-final)
Second hat-trick of the championship: Noel Lane for Galway against Kerry (All-Ireland quarter-final)
Third hat-trick of the championship: Jimmy Barry-Murphy for Cork against Antrim (All-Ireland semi-final)
Widest winning margin: 30 points
Galway 4–24 : 1–3 Kerry (Leinster quarter-final)
Most goals in a match: 8
Cork 7–11 : 1–24 Antrim (All-Ireland semi-final)
Most points in a match: 39
Kilkenny 1–21 : 0–18 Wexford (Leinster quarter-final)
Most goals by one team in a match: 7
Cork 7–11 : 1–24 Antrim (All-Ireland semi-final)
Most goals scored by a losing team: 4
Laois 4–9 : 1–23 Offaly (Leinster semi-final)
Most points scored by a winning team: 24
Galway 4–24 : 1–3 Kerry (Leinster quarter-final)
Most points scored by a losing team: 24
Antrim 1–24 : 7–11 Cork (All-Ireland semi-final)

Top scorers

Season

Single game

See also 

All-Ireland Senior Hurling Championship